Baseball at the 2003 Pan American Games was contested between teams representing Bahamas, Brazil, Cuba, Dominican Republic, Guatemala, Mexico, Nicaragua, Panama, and the United States. The 2003 edition was the 14th Pan American Games, and was hosted by Santo Domingo.

Cuba entered the competition as the eight-time defending champions, having won each gold medal dating back to 1971. They successfully defended their title, with the United States finishing second.

Medal summary

Medal table

Medalists

Tournament
The competition had nine teams divided in two groups. In each group, each team played against all others once and the eight best records advanced to the quarterfinals. The best team from Group A played the lowest ranked team from Group B and vice versa.  Ties within a group were broken by the team allowing the fewest  runs passing to the knockout round.

Preliminary round

Group A

Group B

Knockout round

Medal chart
   Cuba
   United States of America.
   Mexico

See also
 Softball at the 2003 Pan American Games

References

Events at the 2003 Pan American Games
2003
2003 Pan American Games
Pan American Games